Spring Prairie (also Franklin) is an unincorporated community located in the town of Spring Prairie, Walworth County, Wisconsin, United States.

Images

References

External links

Unincorporated communities in Walworth County, Wisconsin
Unincorporated communities in Wisconsin